The 1941 Tschammerpokal was the 7th season of the annual German football cup competition. It was divided into four stages with 64 teams competing in the final stage of six rounds. In the final which was held on 2 November 1941 in the Olympiastadion Dresdner SC defeated Schalke 04 2–1.

Matches

First round

1 The game was aborted after 40 minutes due to a cloudburst.

2 The game was aborted after 74 minutes due to an air raid warning.

Replays

Second round

Replay

Round of 16

Quarter-finals

Semi-finals

Final

References

External links
 Official site of the DFB 
 Kicker.de 
 Tschammerpokal at Fussballberichte.de 

1941
1941 in German football cups